Adam Plack is an Australian-born didgeridoo player, composer and producer, originally from East Brighton in Melbourne. He moved to New York City in 1991 and released four albums before moving into production and composition for meditation music in partnership with Deepak Chopra.

Life and career
Plack comes from a family of classical musicians. He studied classical violin, piano, guitar and voice from a young age. He also enjoyed the improvisations on his father's jazz records and eventually turned toward the Australian landscape for inspiration. Plack picked up the didgeridoo in the early 1990s and began his recording career together with Johnny "White Ant" Soames, releasing the album Dawn Until Dusk (Tribal Song And Didgeridoo) in 1992. The duo produced a second album, Winds of Warning two years later. He has also collaborated with David Gulpilil and other Aboriginal musicians.

Plack has performed and recorded under the name "Nomad," releasing two albums. The first one, Nomad (1994), was nominated for an ARIA Award for Best World Music Album at the ARIA Music Awards of 1995. The single "With You" from the Songman (1999) album, reached Number 2 on the Billboard Dance charts and won the 2001 ASCAP Rhythm and Soul Music Award. Since then he has worked largely on meditation music with Deepak Chopra, including A Gift of Love (1998), which consists of translations of the poems of Rumi. In 2002, Plack released the Coco De Mer album, a project of new-age interpretations of classical arias. 

Plack lives in Los Angeles where he works as a life-coach. He was once married to actress Sonja Sohn.

Discography

Albums

Film/television composer or contributor
Undertow Didgeridoo for feature film score by Philip Glass (2004)
Charlie's Angels "Belly" original song (2000)
Perfume feature film score, directed by Michael Rymer (2001)
Revolution TV film score, directed by Michael Rymer (2009)

Awards and nominations

ARIA Music Awards
The ARIA Music Awards is an annual awards ceremony that recognises excellence, innovation, and achievement across all genres of Australian music. They commenced in 1987.

! 
|-
| 1995
| Nomad
| ARIA Award for Best World Music Album
| 
| 
|-

References

External links
[ Adam Plack page] at Allmusic
Adam Plack photos

Living people
Year of birth missing (living people)
Australian male composers
Australian composers
Australian emigrants to the United States
Didgeridoo players
Musicians from Baltimore
Place of birth missing (living people)
Musicians from Melbourne